Final Fantasy is a media franchise originating from a role-playing video game of the same name, which debuted on the Nintendo Entertainment System in 1987.

Final Fantasy may also refer to:
Final Fantasy (video game), the first video game in the series
Final Fantasy: Legend of the Crystals, a 1994 anime OVA released in Japan as Final Fantasy

In music:
Final Fantasy is the former name of Owen Pallett's Toronto-based musical project
Final Fantasy (album), a 2005 album by Leo Ku, or the title track
"Final Fantasy", a song by Alma from Have U Seen Her?
"Final Fantasy", a song by Drake from Scorpion

See also
List of Final Fantasy media